Annie Macdonald may refer to:
 Annie MacDonald
 Annie S. Macdonald
 Annie MacDonald Langstaff